"The Unknown" is the final episode of the American animated television miniseries Over the Garden Wall. It first aired on Cartoon Network on November 7, 2014. The episode's story was supervised by Amalia Levari, Tom Herpich, and series creator Patrick McHale, while writing and storyboarding were managed by Herpich, Jim Campbell, and Natasha Allegri.

Plot
The bluebird Beatrice navigates through a snowstorm in search of Wirt, and comes across Greg, who is performing meaningless tasks at the request of the Beast. Upon finding Wirt, Beatrice begins to lead him to where she saw Greg. Meanwhile, the Woodsman journeys into the forest as the sun sets, in search of Edelwood. He finds Greg, who is in the process of being turned into an Edelwood tree by the Beast. He attempts to help Greg and to drive the Beast away as Wirt and Beatrice arrive. Having knocked down the Woodsman, the Beast offers to Wirt to keep Greg's soul alive within his lantern, as long as Wirt takes on the Woodsman's task of keeping the lantern alight. Wirt however, realizes that the Beast's soul resides inside the lantern, explaining this to all present, and refuses the offer.

Wirt frees Greg and gives Beatrice the magical scissors belonging to Adelaide, which will cure Beatrice and her family of the curse that transformed them into bluebirds. As they depart, the Woodsman, who had been told by the Beast that he was keeping his daughter alive by keeping the lantern alight, ignores the Beast's continuous lies and extinguishes the lantern, defeating the Beast. After Wirt and Beatrice exchange goodbyes, Wirt is shown awakening underwater in a lake. He pulls Greg up to the surface with him, where the police and his friends await. After being taken by ambulance to a hospital, Wirt regains consciousness and finds that his friends and Sara are present. Sara tells Wirt that she hasn't listened to a cassette tape that he made for her, as she does not own a cassette tape player. Greg, having detailed his adventures in the Unknown to those around him, shakes his pet frog, who rings and glows, indicating that Auntie Whispers' magical bell is still inside him and that Wirt and Greg's journey into the Unknown was not in their imaginations.

In the Unknown, the melancholic Woodsman sits on his porch, and is happily surprised when his daughter appears, having been restored back to life. The other inhabitants of the Unknown appear to be living pleasant lives, and Beatrice and her family are shown in their original human forms. As Greg's frog plays a piano and sings, Greg returns a stolen rock to Mrs. Daniels' garden.

Production
The show, created by Patrick McHale, is based on the 2013 animated short film Tome of the Unknown, which McHale wrote and directed for Cartoon Network Studios as part of their shorts development program. The final episode features Elijah Wood as Wirt, Collin Dean as Greg, Melanie Lynskey as Beatrice, Christopher Lloyd as the Woodsman, and Samuel Ramey as the Beast.

Critical reception
The series as a whole, including the finale, received critical acclaim. The episode has been analyzed for its allusions to fear and choice, with journalist Vrai Kaiser noting that the decision made by Wirt and the Woodsman to no longer light the Beast's lantern represents the discovery of "a truth that can not only shape the future but inform the past".

References

External links

2014 American television episodes
American television series finales